The 2015–16 Texas State Bobcats men's basketball team represented Texas State University in the 2015–16 NCAA Division I men's basketball season. The Bobcats, led by third year head coach Danny Kaspar, played their home games at Strahan Coliseum and were members of the Sun Belt Conference. They finished the season 15–16, 8–12 in Sun Belt play to finish in a tie for seventh place. They defeated Georgia State in the first round of the Sun Belt tournament to advance to the quarterfinals where they lost to Texas–Arlington.

Roster

Schedule

|-
!colspan=9 style="background:#8C1919; color:#FFCC33;"| Exhibition

|-
!colspan=9 style="background:#8C1919; color:#FFCC33;"| Non-conference regular season

|-
!colspan=9 style="background:#8C1919; color:#FFCC33;"| Sun Belt regular season

|-
!colspan=9 style="background:#8C1919; color:#FFCC33;"| Sun Belt tournament

References

Texas State Bobcats men's basketball seasons
Texas State
2015 in sports in Texas
2016 in sports in Texas